Dinichthys (from  , 'terrible' and   'fish') is an extinct monospecific genus of giant, marine arthrodire placoderm from the Late Devonian (Famennian stage), comparable in size, shape, and ecological role to the better-known Dunkleosteus. Fossils were recovered from the Ohio Shale Formation along the Olentangy River in Delaware County, Ohio.

Classification History
Dinichthys was originally described in 1868 by John Newberry on the basis of an incomplete skull roof and mandibles (holotype AMNH 81). Subsequently, many unrelated large arthrodires were originally classified together within this genus, including species now assigned to Dunkleosteus, Eastmanosteus, and Titanichthys. Notably, the type species of Dunkleosteus was originally described as Dinichthys terrelli by Newberry in 1873, and was later separated into Dunkleosteus by Jean-Pierre Lehman in 1956. Dunkleosteus was still thought to be closely related to Dinichthys, and they were grouped together in the family Dinichthyidae. However, in the 2010 Carr & Hlavin phylogenetic study, Dunkleosteus and Dinichthys were found to belong to two separate clades. Carr & Hlavin resurrected the family Dunkleosteidae and placed Dunkleosteus, Eastmanosteus, and a few other genera from Dinichthyidae within it. Dinichthyidae, in turn, is left a monospecific family and dismissed as a family grouping, and the genus Dinichthys is now considered a monotypic genus, containing only the type species, D. herzeri.

Phylogeny
Dinichthys is a member of the clade Aspinothoracidi, which belongs to the clade Pachyosteomorphi, one of the two major clades within Eubrachythoraci. The cladogram below shows the phylogeny of Dinichthys:

References

Arthrodires
Placoderms of North America
Arthrodire genera
Fossil taxa described in 1868
Paleontology in Ohio
Monotypic fish genera